Nigel Alan Bolton (born 14 January 1975) is an English former footballer who played as a forward in the Football League for Darlington.

Bolton was born in Bishop Auckland, County Durham. He began his football career with Northern League club Shildon, where his goalscoring attracted the attention of Football League Third Division club Darlington, for whom he made two league appearances in the 1994–95 season. He then returned to non-league football, playing for West Auckland Town and Tow Law Town before rejoining Shildon in June 2001. Bolton, by then working as a postman and playing in midfield, helped Shildon reach the first round proper of the FA Cup for the first time in more than 40 years. They were drawn to play Division Two club Notts County; Bolton played the first half and Shildon lost 7–2. He left Shildon in 2004 for Darlington Railway Athletic, and also played for Esh Winning, for whom he scored twice in his first two games.

References

1975 births
Living people
Sportspeople from Bishop Auckland
Footballers from County Durham
English footballers
Association football forwards
Shildon A.F.C. players
Darlington F.C. players
West Auckland Town F.C. players
Tow Law Town F.C. players
Darlington Railway Athletic F.C. players
Esh Winning F.C. players
Northern Football League players
English Football League players